The 35th Guangdong-Hong Kong Cup will be held on 29 December 2012 and 1 January 2013. The first leg will be played at Huizhou Olympic Stadium with the second leg to take place at Hong Kong Stadium.

Both Hong Kong and Guangdong were not able to win the Guangdong–Hong Kong Cup after 90 minutes of first leg game and 120 minutes of second leg, which include 30 minutes of extra time. The game ended in 2–2 in aggregate. Hong Kong won 9–8 on penalty shoot-out.

Squads

Guangdong
 Head Coach:  Cao Yang

Hong Kong
 Deputy Head Coach: Kim Pan-Gon
 Assistant coach: Szeto Man Chun

Match details

First leg

Second leg

References

2012–13 in Hong Kong football
2013
2013 in Chinese football